AGRO (rus: АГРО) is the largest Ukrainian exhibition for agriculture, agricultural machinery, livestock farming and the food industry. The event is staged annually in Kyiv and in one of the main industries of Ukraine.

History 
The inaugural AGRO was staged in Kyiv in 1988. In 2018, the event featured some 1,308 exhibitors and 185,000 visitors attended the show over the course of four days. More than 34,000 sq.m of exhibition area outdoors and in 10 halls were covered the same year. 57 business events like conferences, seminars and presentations were held during AGRO 2018. The event was held at the National Complex "Expocentre of Ukraine" in Kyiv. In 2017 the event was organized by the Ministry of Agrarian Policy and Food of Ukraine for the 30th time, official pavilions were organized from the United States of America and the People's Republic of China. AGRO includes the trade fairs ExpoAgroTech, AnimalExpo, PlantGrowing & AgriculturalChemistry, BioFuel, EquiWorld, FishExpo, Hi-Tech AGRO, AGRO BuildExpo and Organic.

AGRO 2020 
The 32nd International Exhibition AGRO 2020 is postponed to August 11 to 14, 2020.

See also 
Ukrainian wine

References 
 USA Pavilion at AGRO 2018 Promotion of the first USA Pavilion at AGRO 2018 - Flyer of the U. S. Commercial Service (PDF; 1180 kB) 
 Letter of the Ministry of Agrarian Policy of Ukraine
 What do exhibitors in Ukraine need to know?, TFI - Trade Fairs International 3-4/2011, author: Wellem Bougie

External links 
 Official website of AGRO 
  Program of the 2nd European-Ukrainian Energy Day European-Ukrainian Energy Agency
 AUMA (Association of the German Trade Fair Industry)
 made in Germany Exhibitors of the German Presentation of the Federal Ministry of Food, Agriculture and Consumer Protection at AGRO 2011
 [https://content.govdelivery.com/accounts/USITATRADE/bulletins/1c854fd U. S. Commercial Service - ND Global News December 2017 - Promote Your Company at AGRO show in Ukraine

Trade fairs in Ukraine
Economy of Ukraine
Science and technology in Ukraine